Inspecter 7 is an American ska band formed in 1992 in New Brunswick, New Jersey, with a sound that combines all three waves of ska (traditional, two-tone and third wave)

After releasing a seven-inch single on Moon Ska Records, and appearing on several compilation albums, including all three volumes of the Oi: Skampilation series, They released their first full-length album in 1997, The Infamous, which received positive reviews.

Over the years, they shared the stage with ska acts including The Scofflaws, The Specials, Mr. Symarip Roy Ellis, Bad Manners, The Mighty Mighty Bosstones, Mephiskapheles, The Skatalites, Fishbone, The Business, Men At Work, The Selecter, Social Decay, The Special Beat, Murphy's Law, General Public. 

In 2013, they released their third full-length album, Escapes And Illusions, on Little Dickman Records.

Scorsese licensed One Step Beyond for use in The Wolf of Wall Street.

Members

Giuseppe Mancini - vocals
Daniella Cardoza - vocals
Jay Monaco - guitar
Matt Zacek - bass
Matt Renzo - drums
King Django - keyboards
Vinny Troyani - tenor saxophone
Brian Varneke - trumpet
Chris Holland - trombone

Former members
Rev Sinister aka T-Dog - vocals
Anton Major - trombone
Stephanie Landers - keyboards
Quincy "Ace Face" Bright - bass
Joseph McCarthy - drums
"Big John" Czifra - alto saxophone
Erik "Lord Skoochie" Schroeder - tenor saxophone
Matt Pinder - baritone horn
Tim "Predator" Boyce - guitar
Jason "Boxcar" Battle - drums
Chris Jof Jefferson - guitar
Jason "Sharky" Balsamello - trumpet
Johnny Liu - trombone
Imran Ansari - alto saxophone
Johnny B
Scott Sullivan - bass
Brian Onka - guitar
Adrian - drums
Glen Miller - guitar
Tedford - trombone
Animal - drums
Mike Yak
Skylar Stills
Andy Daken
Jenny Whiskey - tenor sax
Reggae Bob - bass
Rob George - guitar
Joey Pip
James Kelly
Kurt Moreton
Nuno "Green Goblin" Rodrigues
Adam X

Discography

 "Cookin'" Oi!/Skampilation, Vol. 1 (Various Artists) (Radical Records, September 11, 1995)
 "Agent 86" & "See Ya" 7" single (Moon Ska Records, 1996)
 "Sharky 17" & "Popeye" Oi!/Skampilation, Vol. 2 (Various Artists) (Radical Records, April 5, 1997)
 "Train Song" Oi!/Skampilation, Vol. 3 (Various Artists) (Radical Records, September 8, 1997)
 The Infamous (Radical Records, September 9, 1997)
 "Boots and Suits" The Skoidats and Inspecter 7; 7" split (Radical Records, 1998)
 "One Step Beyond" House of Ska: A Tribute to Madness (Various Artists) (Cleopatra Records, May 18, 2000)
 Banished to Bogeyland (Radical Records, 1999)
 Escapes and Illusions (I7 Records, 2013)

See also

 List of Moon Ska Records artists
 List of ska musicians

References

External links 
  
 

1992 establishments in New Jersey
20th-century American musicians
21st-century American musicians
American ska musical groups
Musical groups established in 1992
Musical groups from New Jersey
New Brunswick, New Jersey
Third-wave ska groups